Myerslopiidae is a family of tree-hoppers which consist of about 20 species in three genera with a distribution limited to New Zealand and Chile. Adult hoppers have a strongly sclerotized body with elytra-like tegmina meeting along the median. The hindwing is undeveloped. Based on observations on Mapuchea chilensis, they are thought to feed on phloem sap.  They were formerly mistakenly placed as a tribe within the Ulopinae (Cicadellidae) by Evans and then raised to subfamily rank before being moved to a different suborder.

References

External links 
 Myserslopiidae from New Zealand   
 Family information  

Hemiptera families